The following is an alphabetical list of topics related to the British Overseas Territory of Anguilla.

0–9

.ai – Internet country code top-level domain for Anguilla

A
Airports in Anguilla
Americas
North America
North Atlantic Ocean
West Indies
Caribbean Sea
Antilles
Lesser Antilles
Islands of Angilla
Anglo-America
Anguilla
Anguillan, adjective and noun for Anguilla
Antilles
Atlas of Anguilla
Anguilla Channel

B
Bibliography of Anguilla
Birds of Anguilla
British Overseas Territory of Anguilla

C
Capital of Anguilla: The Valley
Caribbean
Caribbean Community (CARICOM)
Caribbean Sea
Categories:
:Category:Anguilla
:Category:Anguillan culture
:Category:Anguillan law

:Category:Anguillan people
:Category:Anguilla-related lists
:Category:Buildings and structures in Anguilla
:Category:Communications in Anguilla
:Category:Economy of Anguilla
:Category:Environment of Anguilla
:Category:Geography of Anguilla
:Category:History of Anguilla
:Category:Politics of Anguilla
:Category:Society of Anguilla
:Category:Sport in Anguilla
:Category:Transport in Anguilla
commons:Category:Anguilla
Coat of arms of Anguilla
Commonwealth of Nations
Communications in Anguilla
Culture of Anguilla

D
Demographics of Anguilla

E
Economy of Anguilla
Education in Anguilla
Elections in Anguilla
English colonization of the Americas
English language

F

Flag of Anguilla
Football clubs in Anguilla

G
Geography of Anguilla
"God Bless Anguilla"
Government of Anguilla

H
Hinduism in Anguilla
History of Anguilla

I
International Organization for Standardization (ISO)
ISO 3166-1 alpha-2 country code for Anguilla: AI
ISO 3166-1 alpha-3 country code for Anguilla: AIA
Internet in Anguilla
Islands of Angilla:
Anguilla island
Anguillita
Blowing Rock, Anguilla
Cove Cay
Crocus Cay
Deadman's Cay
Dog Island, Anguilla
East Cay
Little Island, Anguilla
Little Scrub Island
Mid Cay
North Cay
Prickley Pear Cays
Rabbit Island, Anguilla
Sand Island, Anguilla
Scilly Cay
Scrub Island
Seal Island, Anguilla
Sombrero, Anguilla
South Cay
South Wager Island
West Cay

L
Law of Anguilla
Leeward Islands
Lesser Antilles
Lists related to Anguilla:
List of airports in Anguilla
List of Anguilla-related topics
List of birds of Anguilla
List of football clubs in Anguilla
List of islands of Angilla
List of mammals of Anguilla
List of political parties in Anguilla
List of schools in Anguilla
Topic outline of Anguilla

M
Mammals of Anguilla
Military of Anguilla
Music of Anguilla

N
National anthem of Anguilla
North America
Northern Hemisphere

O
Organisation of Eastern Caribbean States (OECS)

P
Politics of Anguilla
List of political parties in Anguilla
Public holidays in Anguilla

S
Sailing in Anguilla

T
The Valley – Capital of Anguilla
Topic outline of Anguilla
Transport in Anguilla

U
United Kingdom of Great Britain and Northern Ireland

V
The Valley, Anguilla

W
West Indies
Western Hemisphere

Wikipedia:WikiProject Topic outline/Drafts/Topic outline of Anguilla

See also

List of Caribbean-related topics
List of international rankings
Lists of country-related topics
Outline of Anguilla

References

External links

 
Indexes of topics by country